Badr al-Din is a male Muslim name composed of the elements Badr and ad-Din. It is used as a given name and a surname.

It may refer to:

Given name
Sheikh Bedreddin (1359–1420), revolutionary theologian and preacher against the Ottoman Empire
Badruddin Ajmal (born 1955), Indian politician
Badruddin Amiruldin (born 1950), Malaysian politician
Badr al-Din al-Ayni (1360–1453), Sunni Islamic scholar of the Hanafi madh'hab
Badradine Belloumou (born 1984), French/Algerian footballer
Bader Eldin Abdalla Galag (born 1981), Sudanese footballer
Badr Al Din Abu Ghazi (1920–1983), Egyptian art critic
Badr al-Din Hilali (1470–1529), Persian poet
 Badruddin Jamaluddin Kazi, real name of Johnny Walker (actor) (1926–2003), Indian movie comedian
Badar Uddin Ahmed Kamran (1951–2020), Bangladeshi politician
Badr al-Din Lu'lu' (died 1259), successor to the Zangid rulers of Mosul
Badreddine Missaoui, Tunisian politician
Badr al-Din Solamish (1272–1291), Sultan of Egypt
Badruddin Tyabji (1844–1906), the third President of the Indian National Congress
Badruddin Umar (born 1931), Bengali Marxist–Leninist historian

Middle name
Ibrahim Badreldin-Sayed (born 1927), Egyptian tennis  player

Family name
 al-Hasan Badr al-Din I (died 1418), leader of the Tayyibi Isma'ili community
 al-Hasan Badr al-Din II (died 1512), leader of the Tayyibi Isma'ili community

Surname
Mustafa Badreddine (1961–2016), military leader of Hezbollah
Rafid Badr Al-Deen (born 1976), Iraqi footballer

See also
Bedrettin
Sultan Mahmud Badaruddin II Airport, Palembang, Indonesia

Arabic masculine given names
Compound given names